Bedazzled may refer to:

Bedazzled (1967 film), a 1967 British comedy film
Bedazzled (2000 film), a remake of the 1967 film
Bedazzled (band), a British band
Bedazzled Records, a record label